Om Bhakta Shrestha (12 April 1933 – 18 March 2020) was a Nepalese judge who served as 11th Chief Justice of Nepal, in office from 12 September 1997 to 12 April 1998. He was appointed by the then-king of Nepal, Birendra.

Shrestha was preceded by Trilok Pratap Rana and succeeded by Mohan Prasad Sharma.

References 

Chief justices of Nepal
1933 births
2020 deaths